John Allan Nielsen (born 8 April 1953) is a Danish former footballer who played as a midfielder or libero for Odense Boldklub and for Dutch club Roda JC Kerkrade. He made two appearances for the Denmark national team in 1984.

Career
Nielsen made 250 appearances for Odense Boldklub scoring 20 goals. With OB, he won the Danish championship twice, in 1977 and 1982, and the Danish Cup once, in 1983.

In 1984, he made two appearances for the Denmark Olympic team, captaining the team in both matches.

Style of play
Mostly a midfielder, Nielsen was described as "reliable" and "hard-working" and with good control of the ball. In his second stint with Odense Boldklub he was deployed as a libero.

Legacy
In 2012, on the occasion of Odense Boldklub's 125th anniversary, Nielsen was voted into the club's all-star team.

Later life
Nielsen later worked as a municipal employee in Odense and was trained as a freight forwarder.

Honours
Odense Boldklub
 Danish 1st Division: 1977, 1982
 Danish Cup: 1982–83

References

External links
 
 
 Interview with Odense Boldklub

1953 births
Living people
Footballers from Odense
Danish men's footballers
Association football midfielders
Association football sweepers
Denmark international footballers
Eredivisie players
Odense Boldklub players
Roda JC Kerkrade players
Danish expatriate men's footballers
Danish expatriate sportspeople in the Netherlands
Expatriate footballers in the Netherlands